Hazelnut production in Turkey is important as Turkey cultivates and processes most of the world's hazelnuts. According to several sources, it has a market share between 70 and 80% of the worldwide hazelnut production.

History and geography 
There are accounts dating back to 1500 BC of hazelnuts being cultivated in the Black Sea region (historically Pontus) and the Turkish historian Evliya Çelebi described hazelnut orchards in the 1650s, during the Ottoman Empire. The hazelnut plantations are mainly located in the Black Sea region between Trabzon and Kocaeli. The hazelnut regions are divided in an older eastern part which spans from Ordu to Artvin and a new hazelnut region in the western part of the Black Sea between Samsun and Kocaeli. Most hazelnuts are grown in the provinces of Ordu, Samsun and Giresun while in Sakarya and Düzce hazelnut production is very efficient. In Ordu alone, 200,000 tons were harvested in 2017.

Orchards 
Several traditional cultivars of hazel tree account for the bulk of the harvest, such as Tombul, Çakıldak, Foşa and Sivri, but since 2012 an ambitious breeding program led to cultivars with a faster ripening process.

Hazelnut plantations are widespread and approximately 400,000 families are in possession of an orchard. After criticism that children have been employed harvesting hazelnuts, Ferrero, one of the main clients of the hazelnut industry and the producer of Nutella, started a Farming Values Programme in 2012. Balsu and Olam International, two other major enterprises involved in the industry, have also begun to tackle child labor in co-operation with Nestlé and the Turkish Government. According to the Business Year, hazelnut production in Turkey has risen steadily since 1964, when a law on a Guarantee of Purchase was introduced, after which a large part of the peasants in the Black Sea region became hazelnut cultivators. Thereafter, Turkey became the most important producer of hazelnuts and exports to more than a 100 countries.

Pests 
The damages on the hazelnut industry in Turkey has been estimated to be US$200 million in 2017, US$300 million in 2018 and is mainly attributed to the brown marmorated stink bug, green stink bug and the powdery mildew.

Brown marmorated stink bug 
The stink bug was first reported in Levent district of Istanbul in Turkey in September 2017. In October of the same year it was observed in Artvin Province and the species has rapidly spread to other areas in Eastern Black Sea Region, where most of the hazelnut production occurs. The bug is believed to have entered the country through Georgia, as it was initially reported in Kemalpaşa, Artvin just few kilometers away from the border between both countries. Celal Tuncer, a professor from the Ondokuz Mayıs University has stated that the bug has already caused a 20% drop in Artvin's hazelnut yield and is expected to cause a 50% drop in hazelnut production and quality in the future. According to Tuncer these drops would lead to US$1 billion in damages to hazelnut producers.

References 

Hazelnuts
Turkish business culture